Alberth may refer to:
Alberth Bravo (born 1987),Venezuelan sprinter
Alberth Elis (born 1996), Honduran footballer
Alberth Papilaya (1967–2021), Indonesian boxer
Alberth Villalobos (born 1995), Costa Rican footballer
Rudolf Alberth (1918–1992), German conductor and composer

See also
Albert (disambiguation)
Albertha, a town in North Dakota